Asa Whitney (1797–1872) was a highly successful dry-goods merchant and transcontinental railroad promoter.

He was one of the first backers of an American transcontinental railway. A trip to China in 1842–44 impressed upon Whitney the need for a transcontinental railroad from the Atlantic to the Pacific.

When Whitney returned to the United States in 1844, he realized the benefits from such an undertaking, and spent a great deal of money trying to get the Congress to take up the project. In 1849, he published A Project for a Railroad to the Pacific. For years he continued to write revised memorials and take expeditions through what was then known as Indian Territory to support his cause.

Later Whitney's dream was realized through the efforts of Theodore Judah. In the end, Whitney lived to see his dream realized in 1869 with the opening of the Union Pacific.

Early life 
Asa Whitney was born on March 14, 1797, in North Groton, Connecticut. His parents were Sarah Mitchell and Shubael Whitney. He is distantly related to Eli Whitney, the inventor of the cotton gin. They were fifth cousins. For five generations, the Whitney family had been farmers. However, from a young age, Asa Whitney showed no interest in agriculture and wanted to be a merchant.

Career 
He went to New York in his late teens to chase his dream of being a merchant. He began as a clerk, working for a huge importer of French goods. He was promoted, and, by 1832, he was a successful dry-goods merchant.

Marriage 
While he was abroad in France in 1832, he married a French girl, Herminie Antoinette Pillet. However, just a mere year after they met, she died on March 31, 1833. She was buried in New Rochelle, very close to where Asa had planned to start a family with her. He married again to Sarah Jay Munro, a daughter of Peter Jay Munro. She died on November 12, 1840. This may have been a miscarriage or an unsuccessful childbirth. She was buried next to Asa’s first wife. In 1852, Whitney married Mrs. Catherine (Moore) Campbell of Wilmington, N.C. She outlived her husband by six years and is buried beside him in Rock Creek Cemetery, Washington, D.C.

Trip to China 
After his second wife died, his property in New York faced foreclosure and was put up for auction. Whitney was only given $10,000 for his property. He sold the rest of his land and drew his interests toward China. On June 18, 1842, he set sail to China on his ship, the Oscar. The Oscar was loaded down with a lot of goods which resulted in the ship moving very slowly. The voyage to China usually took around 100 days, and newer ships could make the trip in as short as 79 days. However, Whitney’s trip took 153 days, a record slowness for the year. Whitney became very angry during this trip and he was apt to having rages and temper tantrums. He arrived in China during the Opium Wars, which was a dispute between the British and the Chinese. After the dispute died down, many other nations began to trade with China, and Whitney became one of a few Americans who helped with the exportation of teas, spices, and other goods. His profits began piling up. By the time he left China, he had enough money to retire. His time in China lasted a year and four months, and he headed back home on April 2, 1844. His trip back was also very long and tedious.

Attempts at a Transcontinental Railroad 
On the way back from China, Asa Whitney began devising a plan that would make the trip to China much easier. He wanted to build a railroad across the United States. People on the East coast could take the train to the West coast, and then take a ship from there to China. It would greatly shorten the long trip. When he arrived back in the United States, he was full of inspiration and drive and he got straight to work. He bought property in upstate New York and began working on a memorial to Congress about his plan for a railroad. His plan was mainly focused on trade with China, and connecting the two countries for increased culture, immigration, and commerce. He believed that the railroad would open trade to all of Asia, and unite the continents. He spent a great amount of time and money to try to promote his plan, and he explored a lot of the routes that he considered. He wrote A Project for a Railroad to the Pacific, a memorial to the United States Congress, in 1849. His plan was detailed and impressive, but he was denied. He continued trying to create the railroad, taking surveys and examining potential routes. He wanted to create a route that went way up north to the Puget Sound. However, no matter how hard he tried, his plan was never accepted, and he stopped campaigning in 1851.

Death 
Asa Whitney lived long enough to see his dream become a reality; he was alive when the first transcontinental railroad was completed. He died in 1872, three years after the golden spike was laid, of typhoid fever.

Legacy 
Although Whitney’s plan fell through, word began spreading of the idea of a transcontinental railroad. His plan inspired many young, ambitious engineers, one of which being Theodore Judah, a man who helped make the dream of a transcontinental railroad into a reality.

Whitney Avenue (later renamed Park Road) in Washington, D.C., was named after Whitney.

References

External links

Praying for a Grant of Land to Enable Him to Construct a Railroad from Lake Michigan to the Pacific Ocean. 1848.
A Lecture on the Railroad to the Pacific (1850) by Calvin Colton

1797 births
1872 deaths
People from Groton, Connecticut
Businesspeople from New Rochelle, New York
American people in rail transportation
19th-century American businesspeople
Burials at Rock Creek Cemetery